The 1971 National Challenge Cup was the 58th awarding of the United States Soccer Football Association's annual open soccer championship prize. Teams from the North American Soccer League declined to participate.  The New York Hota defeated the San Pedro Yugoslavs in the final game.

Bracket

External links
 1971 U.S. Open Cup – TheCup.us

Lamar Hunt U.S. Open Cup
U.S. Open Cup